A hypocephalus is a small disk-shaped object generally made of stuccoed linen, but also of papyrus, bronze, gold, wood, or clay, which ancient Egyptians from the Late Period onwards placed under the heads of their dead. The circle was believed to magically protect the deceased, cause the head and body to be enveloped in light and warmth, making the deceased divine. It replaced the earlier cow-amulet.

Symbolism
Hypocephali symbolized the Eye of Ra (Eye of Horus), which represents the sun deity. The scenes portrayed on them relate to Egyptian ideas of resurrection and life after death, connecting them with the Osirian myth. To the ancient Egyptians the daily setting and rising of the sun was a symbol of death and rebirth. The hypocephalus represented all that the sun encircles — the world of the living, over which it passed during the day, was depicted in the upper half, and that of  the dead, which it crossed during the night, in the lower portion. 

Hypocephali first appeared during the Egyptian Saite Dynasty (663–525 B.C.) and their use continued for centuries.  Chapter 162 of the Book of the Dead version of that period contain directions for the making and use of hypocephali.

Preservation
Hypocephali are kept in museums in Europe (including several examples of the British Museum), the Middle East, and in the United States — three in the University of Pennsylvania Museum of Archaeology and Anthropology and one in the Boston Museum of Fine Arts. No two hypocephali are the same, and there are just over 100 known samples of them.

Gallery of Hypocephali

See also
Joseph Smith Hypocephalus

Footnotes

External links

Images of hypocephali may be found at:
Hypocephali from Abydos
Two Hypocephali

Egyptian artefact types